The Western Maryland J-1 class, also known as the Potomac, was a class of twelve 4-8-4 "Potomac" type steam locomotives built by the Baldwin Locomotive Works in 1947. They were operated by the Western Maryland Railway (WM) in revenue service until the mid-1950s. Like most railroads in the South, the WM did not choose the more common name "Northern", going with the name "Potomac" for their 4-8-4s instead.

They were built to haul freight on the WM mainline and all were retired by 1954.

History
The Western Maryland Railway (WM) was the last North American railroad to adopt the 4-8-4 "Northern" type, and as a railroad that primarily ran within the Southeastern United States, the WM chose to call their 4-8-4s "Potomacs", as named after the Potomac River. These new locomotives were the last new steam locomotives the WM purchased, and as such, they were very modern, efficient and powerful, as well as having relatively large boilers. They also held Timken roller bearings on every driver and tender axle and on the back end of the eccentric rod. All link motion pins used needle bearings. When running at forty-five miles per hour, the "Potomacs" had nearly the same performance as the larger M-2 class 4-6-6-4 "Challenger" types. On the 1.75% grade west out of Cumberland, Maryland, the Potomacs were limited 1,180 tons unassisted. On level trackage, they were capable of running upwards while pulling 5,500 tons, with an 8,000-ton limit for downhill journeys.

Disposition
Due to coming when most railroads were starting to dieselize, the "Potomacs" did not have long careers, being in service for only seven years before being retired and put into storage in Hagerstown and Cumberland in 1954. They remained there until 1957, when the equipment trusts ran out and were subsequently scrapped. None of the J-1s have been preserved.

References

4-8-4 locomotives
Baldwin locomotives
Freight locomotives
Railway locomotives introduced in 1947
Scrapped locomotives
Standard gauge locomotives of the United States